The CLEVER (Cross Lipschitz Extreme Value for nEtwork Robustness) score is a way of measuring the robustness of an artificial neural network towards adversarial attacks.
It was developed by a team at the MIT-IBM Watson AI Lab in IBM Research and first presented at the 2018 International Conference on Learning Representations. It was mentioned and reviewed by Ian Goodfellow as well. It was adopted into a educational game Fool The Bank by Narendra Nath Joshi, Abhishek Bhandwaldar and Casey Dugan

References 

Deep learning
Artificial neural networks